Tom Abbott (born 7 December 1981 in London, England) is a broadcaster and sports commentator, best known for his work with The Golf Channel and NBC. He serves as a presenter and commentator for coverage of the PGA Tour, LPGA Tour, and European Tour.  Since 2010, Abbott has been co-host of The Big Break.

Early life

Abbott grew up in Cheam, a suburb of London, England. He attended Wilson's School, an all-boys' school in Wallington, Surrey. During his youth, Abbott was a keen golfer, representing Surrey at Junior and Men's level, and also playing for the England Schools' golf team. He played on the golf team at Mercer University in Macon, Georgia, graduating in 2004 with a degree in Media Business. In October 2015 Abbott was inducted into the Mercer Athletic Hall of Fame.

Early career

Abbott began his broadcasting career at Mercer University, helping to create an on-campus television station, Mercer99.  While in Macon, he worked with local ABC affiliate WPGA-TV, appearing weekly on the "58 Sports Show". Abbott was an intern at WGCL-TV in Atlanta, Georgia. His first full-time broadcasting job came in 2004 with the then-brand-new CBS affiliate in Charlottesville, Virginia, WCAV-TV. Abbott was the affiliate's first-ever Sports Anchor, helping to launch, and appearing on, the inaugural newscast for CBS-19 News in November 2004.

Golf Channel

Abbott joined Golf Channel in November 2005 as a reporter and presenter for the network's UK Channel, based in Orlando, Florida. He worked on the news show Golf Central, and also hosted LPGA Tour coverage alongside Laura Baugh. The Golf Channel UK went off the air on 31 December 2007 but Abbott was retained by the network to work on its U.S.-based operation.

In January 2008, he began hosting European Tour coverage, as well as reporting and anchoring Golf Central. Abbott also became the voice behind the Top 10 series for one season. In late 2008, Abbott began appearing on the network's LPGA Tour coverage.

In 2009, Abbott reported on the announcement of golf's inclusion into the Olympics from Copenhagen, Denmark. Seven years later at the games in Rio, golf returned to The Olympics and Abbott was part of the NBC Sports broadcast team.

In 2010, Abbott replaced Vince Cellini as host of Golf Channel's hit series, The Big Break. Abbott has gone-on to host eleven seasons of Big Break, including Big Break NFL, alongside Michele Tafoya, and the latest season Big Break, The Palm Beaches, Florida which aired in early 2015. In June 2015, Golf Channel significantly reduced its original programming division putting The Big Break on-hold, it is unclear when the show will return to the network or whether Abbott will continue as host.

In 2012, Abbott made his first appearance on Golf Channel's PGA Tour coverage. A year later, he appeared for the first time as an announcer and interviewer for NBC at the U.S. Women's Open. Two years later, Abbott was part of the BBC commentary team at the Ricoh Women's British Open from Royal Birkdale Golf Club. Later in 2014, he appeared as a tower announcer for NBC's coverage of The Ryder Cup.

In 2015, Abbott called the winning putt for the USA in their victory over Europe at the Solheim Cup in Heidelberg, Germany. A few weeks later he was part of the commentary team for Golf Channel & NBC's coverage of the President's Cup in Songdo, South Korea, meaning by the age of 33 Abbott had commentated the Ryder, President's, Solheim and Walker Cups.

Golf Channel & NBC began a 13-year commitment to broadcast The Open in 2016 and Abbott was part of the commentary team at Royal Troon.

Personal life

Abbott resides in Orlando, Florida.

External links
link to Tom Abbott's agent
link to Golf Channel's Big Break homepage

Golf writers and broadcasters
British sports broadcasters
Mercer University alumni
People from Cheam
People from Orlando, Florida
1981 births
Living people